Issa Kalantari (born 1952 in Marand, East Azerbaijan) is an Iranian politician and former head of Department of Environment, serving from 2017 to 2021. He served as minister of agriculture in last year of Khamenei's presidency, in both terms of Rafsanjani's presidency and also in first term of President Khatami. 

Isa Kalantari lost his elder brother, Mousa, in Hafte Tir bombing on 28 June 1981. 

He has a BSc degree of agriculture from Urmia University, MSc of Physiology-Biochemistry from University of Nebraska, and PhD in agricultural physiology from Iowa State University. He was a member of the Center for Strategic Research in the Expediency Discernment Council. In 2001, he founded Iran's House of Farmers and has been serving as its director since then.

See also
 Mosa Kalantari
 Hamidreza Moghaddamfar

References

Government ministers of Iran
People from Marand
Iranian reformists
Urmia University alumni
Iowa State University alumni
1952 births
Living people
Iranian chief executives
Executives of Construction Party politicians
Heads of Department of Environment (Iran)
University of Nebraska–Lincoln alumni